Germantown (Pennsylvania Dutch: Deitscheschteddel) is an area in Northwest  Philadelphia. Founded by German, Quaker, and Mennonite families in 1683 as an independent borough, it was absorbed into Philadelphia in 1854. The area, which is about six miles northwest from the city center, now consists of two neighborhoods: 'Germantown' and 'East Germantown'.

Germantown has played a significant role in American history; it was the birthplace of the American antislavery movement, the site of a Revolutionary War battle, the temporary residence of George Washington, the location of the first bank of the United States, and the residence of many notable politicians, scholars, artists, and social activists.

Today the area remains rich in historic sites and buildings from the colonial era, some of which are open to the public.

Boundaries

Germantown stretches for about two miles along Germantown Avenue northwest from Windrim and Roberts Avenues. Germantown has been consistently bounded on the southwest by Wissahickon Avenue, on the southeast by Roberts Avenue, and on the east by Wister Street and Stenton Avenue, but its northwest border has expanded and contracted over the years. When first incorporated as a borough in 1689, Germantown was separated from the rural Germantown Township by Washington Lane; later, the border was expanded to Carpenter and East Gorgas Lanes; it was then rolled back to Washington Lane in 1846, and remained there until the borough was absorbed into the city of Philadelphia in 1854.

Today, the western part of the former borough is the neighborhood known simply as 'Germantown' (though is sometimes called 'West Germantown') and the eastern part is the neighborhood of 'East Germantown'. While the boundary between the two neighborhoods is not well-defined and has varied over time, these days 'Germantown' usually refers to the part of the former borough that lies west of Germantown Avenue, up through West Johnson Street, and 'East Germantown' to the part that lies east of Germantown Avenue, up through East Upsal Street.

The neighborhood of Mount Airy lies to the northwest, Ogontz and West Oak Lane to the northeast, Logan to the east, Nicetown–Tioga to the south, and East Falls to the southwest.
 
The majority of Germantown is covered by the 19144 zip code, but the area north of Chew Avenue falls in the 19138 zip code.

History and demographics

Although the arrival by ship of the later founders of Germantown in Philadelphia on October 6, 1683, was later to provide the date for German-American Day, a holiday in the United States, historical research has shown that nearly all of the first thirteen Quaker and Mennonite families were in fact Dutch rather than Germans. These families, which were mainly Dutch but also included some Swiss, had relocated to Krefeld (near the Dutch border) and Kriegsheim (in Rhineland-Palatinate) some years prior to their emigration to America to avoid persecution of their Mennonite beliefs in the Dutch Republic and Swiss Confederacy. The town was named Germantown by the group's leader Franz Pastorius, a German preacher from Sommerhausen. The towns population remained largely Dutch-speaking until 1709, after which a number of the Dutch families set out west and a series of major German emigrations reached Germantown and Pennsylvania as a whole. Their initial leader, Pastorius, later aligned himself with newer German arrivals and as the only university-trained and legal and literary man among the early settlers, chronicled and stressed the towns German origins.  Adding to the assimilating of Dutch culture was the fact that the direct vicinity of the settlement was already inhabited by fifty-four German families who had accompanied Johan Printz to the Swedish settlement on the Delaware several years before 1683 and had resettled themselves. 
Francis Daniel Pastorius was the first bailiff. Jacob Telner, Derick Isacks op den Graeff and his brother Abraham Isacks op den Graeff, Reynier Tyson, and Tennis Coender (Thones Kunders) were burgesses, besides six committeemen. They had authority to hold "the general court of the corporation of Germantowne", to make laws for the government of the settlement, and to hold a court of record. This court went into operation in 1690, and continued its services for sixteen years.

In 1688, five years after its founding, Germantown became the birthplace of the anti-slavery movement in America. Pastorius, Gerret Hendericks, Derick Updegraeff and Abraham Opdengraef gathered at Thones Kunders's house and wrote a two-page condemnation of slavery and sent it to the governing bodies of their Quaker church, the Society of Friends. The petition was mainly based upon the Bible's Golden Rule, "Do unto others as you would have them do unto you." Though the Quaker establishment took no immediate action, the 1688 Germantown Quaker Petition Against Slavery was a clear and forceful argument against slavery and initiated the process of banning slavery in the Society of Friends (1776) and Pennsylvania (1780).

In 1723, Germantown became the site of the first congregation of Schwarzenau Brethren in the New World. The Church of the Brethren - among other churches - have their roots in the Schwarzenau Brethren.

When Philadelphia was occupied by the British during the American Revolutionary War, British units were housed in Germantown. In the Battle of Germantown, on October 4, 1777, the Continental Army attacked the garrison. During the battle, a group of civilians fired on the British troops as they marched up the avenue, mortally wounding British officer James Agnew. The Americans withdrew after firing on one another in the confusion of the battle, which resulted in the battle becoming a British victory. The American losses amounted to 673 men and the British losses consisted of 575 men, but along with the American victory at Saratoga on October 17 when John Burgoyne surrendered, the battle led to the official recognition of the Americans by France, which formed an alliance with the Americans afterward.

During his presidency, George Washington and his family lodged at the Deshler-Morris House in Germantown to escape the city and the yellow fever epidemic of 1793. The first bank of the United States was also located here during his administration.

Germantown proper, and the adjacent German Township, were incorporated into the City of Philadelphia in 1854 by the Act of Consolidation.

Italians began settling Germantown in 1880, and comprised an active and vibrant part of the community.

The significant changes that occurred in Philadelphia's demographics at the start of the 20th century caused major shifts in Germantown's ethnic makeup as well. When the first wave of the Great Migration brought more than 140,000 African Americans to the city from the South, long-established Philadelphians started to move to the outskirts. During this time, many German, Scots-Irish, and Irish families moved to Germantown.

During the 1940s, a second mass migration of African Americans from the south to Philadelphia occurred. While the majority of middle-class African American newcomers first settled in North Philadelphia, the housing shortages in this area that followed the end of World War II caused later arrivals to move instead to the Northwest. This led to a wave of new housing construction. To meet the housing needs of the growing numbers of African American families moving into southern Germantown, the Philadelphia Redevelopment Authority allocated $10.6 million for the creation of public housing.

Between 1954 and 1956, Germantown experienced an influx of lower-income African Americans, resulting in a decline in property values and triggering a "white flight" of the majority of white residents to the suburbs. The demographic shift caused a slow but steady decline in central Germantown's upscale shopping district, with the last department store, a J. C. Penney branch, closing in the early 1980s.

The current demographics of Germantown reflects this shift. As of the 2010 US Census, Germantown proper is 77% black, 15% white, 3% non-white Hispanic, and 2% Asian, and East Germantown is 92% black, 3% white, 2% non-white Hispanic, and 2% Asian.

Eugene Stackhouse, a retired former president of the Germantown Historical Society says that the demographic transition of Germantown into a predominantly black neighborhood was the result of the now illegal practice of blockbusting. "It was a great disgrace. Cheap houses would be sold to a black family, then the realtors would go around and tell the neighbors that the blacks are invading", said Stackhouse. The practice was used to trigger panic selling.

Education

Primary and secondary schools

Public schools
Germantown is zoned to the School District of Philadelphia, as is all of Philadelphia. Public schools located in Germantown include the Anna L. Lingelbach School (K–8), the John B. Kelly School (K–6), the John Wister Elementary School (K–6), the Hill Freedman Middle School (6–8), the Theodore Roosevelt Middle School (7–8), the Fitler Academics Plus School (1–8), and the Martin Luther King High School (9–12). The Robert Fulton Elementary School and Germantown High School, a regional public high school located in Germantown, were both closed in 2013.

Charter schools

Mastery Charter Schools operates the Mastery Charter Pickett Campus (7–12, MCPC) in Germantown. The school opened in August 2007. The charter system headquarters is located at Pickett. Germantown Settlement Charter School (5–8), Imani Education Circle Charter school (pre-K to 8), and the Wissahickon Charter School's Awbury Campus (6th–8th) is located in the neighborhood . The Pennsylvania School for the Deaf, a private state-chartered school, occupies the former site of Germantown Academy, which moved to Fort Washington, Pennsylvania in 1965.

Private schools
Germantown's private schools include the DePaul Catholic School (K–8), Waldorf School of Philadelphia (PreK-8), the High Street Christian Academy (K–4), the Germantown Islamic School, the Green Tree School (special education, ages 6–21), and two Quaker schools: Germantown Friends School and Greene Street Friends School.

Nearby private schools include Mount Airy's Revival Hill Christian High School (9–12), Blair Christian Academy (PreK–12), Islamic Day School of Philadelphia (PreK–5), Project Learn School (K–8), Classroom on Carpenter Lane (K-2), and Holy Cross School (K–8), as well as  Chestnut Hill's Springside School (PreK–12), Chestnut Hill Academy (K–12), and Crefeld School (7–12). The William Penn Charter School (commonly known as Penn Charter), the oldest Quaker school in the world, is located in nearby East Falls.

Higher education

La Salle University is in both Germantown and historic Belfield. Its west campus is centered on the old Germantown Hospital buildings and property, which it purchased in 2007. Other universities and colleges close to Germantown include Drexel University College of Medicine's Queen Lane Medical Campus, Arcadia University, Chestnut Hill College, The Lutheran Theological Seminary at Philadelphia, Philadelphia University, and Saint Joseph's University.

Other teaching institutions
Settlement Music School, the largest community school of the arts in the United States, operates one of its six branches in Germantown.

Public libraries
Free Library of Philadelphia operates public libraries. The Joseph E. Coleman Northwest Regional Library is located in Germantown. The library was given its current name in 2002, after Joseph E. Coleman, a member of the Philadelphia City Council.

Transportation
The first railroad in Philadelphia was the Philadelphia, Germantown and Norristown Railroad, which linked Germantown to a station at 9th and Green Streets in Center City. It opened in 1832, and was initially powered by horses. The inventor Matthias W. Baldwin built his first commissioned steam locomotive for the new railroad. Nicknamed Old Ironsides, it eventually reached a peak speed of 28 mph.

Today two SEPTA Regional Rail lines connect the neighborhood to Center City: the Chestnut Hill West Line with stops at Queen Lane, Chelten Avenue, and Tulpehocken stations; and the Chestnut Hill East Line with stops at Wister, Germantown, and Washington Lane stations.

The neighborhood is also served by bus routes 18, 23 (formerly a trolley line), 26, 53 (formerly a trolley line), 65, H and XH, J, and K.

Parks and recreation areas

Germantown has numerous parks and recreation areas. These include:

Awbury Arboretum, a historic 55-acre arboretum and estate
Carpenter Park
Clifford Park
Cliveden Park
Cloverly Park
East Germantown Recreation Center
Fernhill Park
Germantown Cricket Club (private)
Hansberry Garden and Nature Center
Happy Hollow Playground
Kelly Playground
Loudoun Park
Vernon Park
Waterview Recreation Center
Wissahickon Valley Park (bordering), a 1400-acre park that is part of the Fairmount Park system. 
Wister's Woods Park (bordering)

Historic sites

National Historic Landmark Districts
Colonial Germantown Historic District
Rittenhousetown Historic District

National Historic Districts
Awbury Historic District
Tulpehocken Station Historic District

National Historic Landmarks
 Cliveden, the estate of Benjamin Chew, an important site during the Battle of Germantown, open to the public
 Germantown Cricket Club
 John Johnson House, a site on the Underground Railroad, open to the public
 Charles Willson Peale House
 Wyck House, open to the public

National Register of Historic Places
Other sites listed separately on the NRHP:

Alden Park Manor
Beggarstown School
Conyngham-Hacker House
Delmar Apartments
Deshler-Morris House
Fitler School
Germantown Grammar School
Grumblethorpe
Howell House
 Loudoun Mansion
 Ebenezer Maxwell House
Mayfair House
 Oaks Cloister
Thomas Meehan School
 Mennonite Meetinghouse
 Charles Schaeffer School
Upsala
Grumblethorpe Tenant House
St. Peter's Episcopal Church of Germantown
William C. Sharpless House
Smyser and English Pharmacy
Sally Watson House
Wyck House
YMCA of Germantown

Gallery of historic houses and architecture
For a more complete gallery of contributing properties in the Colonial Germantown Historic District see here

Other historic buildings, places, and sites

 Barron House
Boxwood, 156 W. School House Lane, 1897-98
 Concord School House
The Francis Strawbridge House, Wissahickon Avenue, Germantown
The Germantown Boys' Club, 23 W. Penn Street, 1898-1909
Germantown High School, 5901-13 and 5915-41 Germantown Avenue
 Gilbert Stuart Studio
 Green Tree Tavern (Germantown)
The Jonathan Graham House, 5356 Chew Avenue, Germantown
The King Green House, 5112-14 Germantown Avenue
The Leibert House, 6950 Germantown Avenue, ca.1800-08
Little Wakefield, 1701 Lindley Avenue
 Lower Burial Ground (Hood Cemetery)
The Lutheran Theological Seminary Historic District, Mt. Airy
 The Connie Mack House
The Methodist Episcopal Church of the Advocate, 5250 Wayne Avenue, Germantown, Philadelphia, PA
St. Michael's Lutheran Church, 6671 Germantown Avenue, Mt. Airy, ca.1728-1897
Mitchell, Fletcher, & Co., Inc., 5708 Germantown Avenue, Germantown, ca.1811-1911
 The Upper Burial Ground
 Vernon Park
The Wachsmuth-Henry House, 4908 Germantown Avenue, ca.1760
Woodside, The Dorfeuille-Hacker Country Seat, 339 E. Wister Street, ca.1797

In popular culture
The 1946 book, Bright April, written and illustrated by Marguerite de Angeli, features scenes of 1940s Germantown while addressing the divisive issue of racial prejudice experienced by African Americans.

The 2015 novel Loving Day is set in Germantown.

Notable people

 Herb Adderly NFL Hall Of Fame Green Bay Packers 
 Louisa May Alcott, author of the Little Women series of books
 M. K. Asante, filmmaker, professor, rapper, author
 James Barron, naval hero
 Bilal, singer-songwriter
 Samuel Blair, second Chaplain of the United States House of Representatives
 Anna Richards Brewster, painter
 Elaine Brown, Black Panther Party leader
 Martin Grove Brumbaugh, Governor of Pennsylvania, 1914–1919
 Mary Carr, film actress
 George Washington Carpenter, scientist
 Benjamin Chew, Chief Justice of Pennsylvania
 Clarence Clark, professional tennis player, winner of the U.S. National Championships
 Daniel Clark, Delegate from the Territory of Orleans to the U.S. House of Representatives
 Walter Leighton Clark, American businessman, inventor, and artist
 Joseph Sill Clark, Sr., tennis player
 Florence Van Leer Earle Coates, American poet
 William M. Colladay, Wisconsin politician
 John Conard, member of the U.S. House of Representatives from Pennsylvania
 Bill Cosby, comedian, actor, musician, author, educator
 Charles Darrow, credited inventor of the Monopoly game
 Marguerite de Angeli, writer and illustrator of children's books
 Amrit Desai, yogi, founder of the Kripalu Center
 Byron W. Dickson, college football coach
 George Ege, member of the U.S. House of Representatives from Pennsylvania
 James Engle, speaker of the Pennsylvania House of Representatives
 Lola Falana, singer, dancer, and actress
 Mantle Fielding, architect 
 Sidney George Fisher, author
 Janet Gaynor, film, stage and television actress and painter
 Frederic Gehring, Catholic priest, National Chaplain for the Catholic War Veterans
 Henry Gibson, actor
 Walter B. Gibson, author known for the pulp fiction character The Shadow
 Thomas Godfrey, inventor of the octant
 William Newport Goodell, artist, craftsman, and educator
 Jacob C. Gottschalk, first Mennonite bishop in America
 Abraham op den Graeff, one of the first settlers from Crevelt, Germany who established Germantown and its surrounding Township six miles northwest of Philadelphia, merchant, politician
 Nelson Graves, Philadelphian cricketer
 Carolyn Green, competition swimmer and two-time Pan American Games gold medalist
 Albert M. Greenfield, businessman, political activist, philanthropist; lived in Germantown 1920s–1930s
 Rufus Harley, jazz musician
 Alfred C. Harmer, member of the U.S. House of Representatives from Pennsylvania
 Ross Granville Harrison, biologist and anatomist
 Charles Hoffner, pro golfer, member of first Ryder Cup team
 Bernard Hopkins, professional boxer
 Marcus Jastrow, Talmudic scholar
 Eve, rapper, actress
 Edwin Jellett, writer
 Lindley Johnson, Philadelphia architect
 Lloyd Jones, Olympic athlete
 Florence Kelley, social and political reformer
 Khia, rapper, record producer
 Florence Kirk, American soprano
 Adam Kuhn, physician, professor, and botanist
 Maggie Kuhn, activist, founder of the Gray Panthers
 Maxine Kumin, poet and author
 George Cochran Lambdin, Victorian flower painter
 George Landenberger, 23rd Governor of American Samoa
 Noyes Leech (1921–2010), law professor at the University of Pennsylvania Law School
 George Lippard, novelist, journalist, playwright, social activist, labor organizer
 Eric Lobron, German chess grand master of American descent
 James Logan, statesman
 Sarah Logan Wister Starr, humanitarian
 John W. Lord, Jr., Pennsylvania State Senator, Philadelphia City Councilman, United States District Judge
 Airrion Love, member of the R&B group The Stylistics
 G. Love, born Garrett Dutton III, front man of the musical band G. Love & Special Sauce
 Alexander Mack, leader of the German Baptists
 Connie Mack, the longest-serving manager in Major League Baseball history
 Abe Manley, sports executive
 J. Howard Marshall, wealthy magnate and husband of Anna Nicole Smith
 Logan Marshall, author
 John Alden Mason, archaeological anthropologist and linguist
 Jimmy McGriff, jazz musician
 Robert L. McNeil, Jr., developer of Tylenol and chairman of McNeil Laboratories
 Thomas Meehan, botanist and author
 Thomas Lynch Montgomery, historian and librarian
 George T. Morgan former chief engraver at the United States Mint
 James K. Morrow, writer
 Eleanor Myers, archaeologist
 William Jackson Palmer, founder of Colorado Springs, Colorado
 Francis Daniel Pastorius, leader of the Germantown settlement
 James DeWolf Perry, Presiding Bishop of the Episcopal Church
 Christian Frederick Post, Moravian Church missionary
 Ellen Bernard Thompson Pyle, illustrator known for her Saturday Evening Post covers
 Sun Ra, Jazz musician
 Edmund Randolph, the first United States Attorney General
 Theodore William Richards, recipient of 1914 Nobel Prize in Chemistry
 David Rittenhouse, astronomer, mathematician, first director of the United States Mint
 William Rittenhouse, founded the first paper mill in the colonies
 Owen J. Roberts, Supreme Court Justice
 Ralph J. Roberts, co-founder and former CEO of Comcast
 Charley Ross, four-year-old kidnapping victim in 1874
 Charles Frederick Schaeffer, Lutheran clergyman 
 Francis Schaeffer, Christian theologian
 William I. Schaffer, lawyer, Pennsylvania Attorney General and Supreme Court Justice
 J. Barney Sherry, silent film actor
 William Shippen, Philadelphia physician, civic and educational leader who represented Pennsylvania in the Continental Congress
 Benjamin Shoemaker, mayor of Philadelphia
 Ron Sider, founder of Evangelicals for Social Action
 Frederick Smith, lawyer, Pennsylvania Attorney General and Pennsylvania Supreme Court Justice
 Patti Smith, punk rock singer-songwriter, poet and visual artist
 Mike Sojourner, professional basketball player
 Christopher Sower the elder, printed the first German-language Bible in America
 Christopher Sower the younger, clergyman and printer
 Christopher Sower III, loyalist printer
 Martin Luther Stoever, Lutheran educator and writer
 Witmer Stone, ornithologist and botanist
 Gilbert Stuart, portrait artist
 Walter Stuempfig, Romantic realism artist
 Clyde Summers, lawyer and educator who advocated for labor union democracy
 Thomas De Lage Sumter, U.S. Representative from South Carolina
 Frederick Winslow Taylor, engineer, management theorist, and consultant
 Meldrick Taylor, professional boxer
 Russell Thompkins, Jr., songwriter of the R&B group The Stylistics
 Bill Tilden, tennis player
 Henry van Dyke, author, educator, and clergyman
 George Washington, first president of the United States. Lived in Germantown briefly at the Deshler-Morris House
 Grover Washington, Jr., saxophonist
 Ora Washington, professional tennis player
 William Walter Webb, Episcopal bishop
 Langhorne Wister, Civil War brevet brigadier general
 Owen Wister, author
 Sally Wister, Philadelphia campaign diarist
 Jeremiah Wright, Black theology pastor
 John Zacherle, television host, radio personality and voice actor
 PnB Rock, R&B singer, rapper, composer

Image gallery

See also

 German American
 German-American Day

References

External links

 Art by Joseph Ropes (1812–1885), Scene in Germantown, Pa., 1874
 Art by William Britton, Market Square, Germantown, c. 1820
 Atlas of the Late Borough of Germantown, 22nd Ward, City of Philadelphia, 1871
 Chronology of the Political Subdivisions of the County of Philadelphia, 1683–1854
 Clickable map of Historic Germantown (Independence Hall Association)
 Germantown Historical Society
 Germantown general court records, 1691–1701; includes land disputes, apprenticeships, sales of goods, personal matters, etc.
 History of Old Germantown (1907), online version
 Incorporated District, Boroughs, and Townships in the County of Philadelphia, 1854 By Rudolph J. Walther
 Northwest Philadelphia, The Encyclopedia of Greater Philadelphia
 Phillyhistory.org, Historic Photographs of Philadelphia, City Archives

 
1683 establishments in Pennsylvania
1854 disestablishments in Pennsylvania
German-American culture in Philadelphia
German-American history
Historic districts in Philadelphia
Municipalities in Philadelphia County prior to the Act of Consolidation, 1854
National Register of Historic Places in Philadelphia
Neighborhoods in Philadelphia
Populated places established in 1683